The Pennsylvania Governor's Schools of Excellence (PGSE) are five-week, publicly funded summer program for gifted high school students.

Pennsylvania Governor Ed Rendell cut funding for the PGSE program in the state's 2009-2010 budget.  Five of the programs have been privately revived and are functioning members of the National Conference of Governor's Schools as of 2014.

Programs
 The Pennsylvania Governor's School for the Agricultural Sciences at the Pennsylvania State University
 The Pennsylvania Governor's School for Engineering and Technology at Lehigh University
 The Pennsylvania Governor's School for Global Entrepreneurship at Lehigh University - (renamed the Pennsylvania School for Global Entrepreneurship)
 The Pennsylvania Governor's School for Information, Society & Technology at Drexel -  closed
 The Pennsylvania Governor's School for Health Care at the University of Pittsburgh -  (renamed the University of Pittsburgh Health Career Scholars Academy) 
 The Pennsylvania Governor's School for the Sciences at Carnegie Mellon University
 The Pennsylvania Governor's School for the Arts at Mercyhurst University -  closed
 The Pennsylvania Governor's School for Global & International Studies at the University of Pittsburgh
 The Pennsylvania Governor's School for Excellence in Teaching at (Millersville State University) --closed

References

External links
PGSE Homepage
PA School for Global Entrepreneurship at Lehigh University

Education in Pennsylvania
Gifted education
Summer schools